Lim Kay Tong or Kay Tong Lim (born 10 July 1954) is a veteran Singaporean film, TV and stage actor. Notably, he starred opposite Sean Penn in Shanghai Surprise (1986), Pierce Brosnan in Noble House (1988) and Claire Danes in Brokedown Palace (1999), and was the lead actor in Growing Up (1996–2001) and Perth (2004). Lim has been called "Singapore's finest actor", "Singapore's best-known actor" and Singapore's answer to thespians Ian McKellen and Alec Guinness.

Lim is a co-founder and board member of TheatreWorks. He played founding Prime Minister Lee Kuan Yew in the film celebrating Singapore's Golden Jubilee, 1965.

Early years
Growing up, Lim's parents introduced him to plays, literature, and all things artistic from the many books around their house. Lim's father, a radiologist, wanted him to become a barrister, but was supportive of his acting dreams.

Educated at Anglo-Chinese School and a boarding school in England, Lim was a national rugby player in his youth, playing the wing-forward position. While serving National Service, Lim earned a Singapore Armed Forces Colours award for his accomplishments in rugby.

In 1975, Lim moved to East Riding of Yorkshire, England, to further his education. He graduated from the University of Hull in 1978 with a Bachelor of Acts (Honours) in English and Drama, where the late Anthony Minghella was his contemporary and tutor. In 1980, he earned a diploma in Acting from the Webber-Douglas Academy of Dramatic Art in London. In England, he had several bit parts for the BBC's Doctor Who and The Chinese Detective series. In between these walk-on roles, Lim took on odd jobs like window washing, being a night janitor and washing dishes to earn extra money.

Career
Lim's acting career began on the stage, when he auditioned for a production while being bored during National Service. In 1974, he starred in Robert Yeo's landmark play, Are You There, Singapore? for the Experimental Theatre Club. His other initial acting roles were in the plays Equus (1975) and Marching Song (197?) for the University Drama Society and One Mad Night (1975) for the Stage Club.

Upon his return from England, Lim played the lead role in the Experimental Theatre Club's Terry Rex (1982). The Straits Times Minu Tharoor praised his Terry, writing, "Stage presence is too cliché a term for the imaginative energy with which Kay Tong took control of the play, the stage and his part". For his performance, Lim clinched the Singapore Drama Festival Best Actor Award.

In the same year, Lim began his career as a journalist with The Straits Times. While covering the arts, Lim continued acting in plays like David Henry Hwang's F.O.B. (Fresh Off Boat) (1982), Chandran Lingam's The Nuns (1983) and Abigail's Party (1983), for which his "marvellously taut performance" was praised by The Singapore Monitor'''s Yap Koon Hong.

Lim's entry into film began in 1984, when he auditioned for the New York casting agent of Year of the Dragon (1985) in Singapore. Lim was unsuccessful, but the casting agent remembered him and recommended him for Shanghai Surprise (1986). Although the film was not critically acclaimed, it gave Lim the break to star in films like Keys to Freedom (1988) and Fifty/Fifty (1992). Lim also got the role of an interrogator in Bernardo Bertolucci's The Last Emperor (1987), but had to give up the role due to a scheduling conflict.

In 1985, Lim tried his hand at directing with David Mamet's Glengarry Glen Ross, retitled Paradise Heights, for the Drama Festival. The Straits Times Rebecca Chua found that Lim's debut as director "displayed some uncertainty". In the same year, Lim resigned from The Straits Times to set up TheatreWorks in February. TheatreWorks, the first adult professional theatre company in Singapore, was formed to "promote theatre that is relevant to Singaporeans" and create work for English-language actors. Lim served as the company's press and media relations consultant, in addition to acting in several of their plays. Lim also acted in the English-language versions of Kuo Pao Kun's influential plays The Coffin is Too Big for the Hole (1985) and No Parking on Odd Days (1986). Both productions travelled to the Hong Kong Arts Festival in 1987. Of the role he originated in The Coffin is Too Big for the Hole, Lim remembers: "For me, [a one-man show] was panic stations. I had never done a long monologue. In drama school, we had to prepare monologues based on a Shakespearean character. Nothing like this, which was 30 to 35 minutes long. And [Kuo] spent at least a couple of weeks just talking to me. I was worried. Because I thought, when is he going to get down to it?" In preparation, Kuo and Lim visited a coffin-maker and discussed the nature of funerals while Lim memorised the script.

In the late 1980s, Lim spent a few years in Los Angeles, landing roles in Off Limits (1988) and It Could Happen to You (1994). He found the city "very cutthroat and very fake. I didn't like the obsession with showbiz there. It wasn't like living a normal life in a normal city. I knew it was tough before I went, but I also knew if I stayed any longer my soul would be destroyed. The truth is that you had to be in the racial majority to get the parts." Lim also confessed that he's "not one for schmoozing. My career would have been severely hampered if I had hung out there."

Returning to Singapore for good in 1994, Lim starred in MediaCorp's award-winning TV programme Growing Up (1996–2001), set in 1960s and 1970s Singapore. His "outstanding portrayal" as the family patriarch led him to be named by The Straits Times as one of the top ten dads on TV in 2013. During his tenure on Growing Up, Lim experienced deaths in his family, which led him to reflect on his role: "You understand grief, loss, redemption, hope...It was a good time to have played that role not only for the experience as an actor, but also [its lessons in] life. If you're to be remembered for a role for the rest of your life, make the most of it." From 1999 to the early 2000s, Lim wrote a fortnightly column for The New Paper.

Lim's career-defining lead performance as Harry Lee in Perth (2004) was praised by TODAY's Ross Wallace, who wrote, "If there were any doubts that Lim Kay Tong is Singapore's finest actor, 2004's Perth should have laid them to rest...[a] towering performance". Comparing his acting to Robert De Niro and Al Pacino, TODAY also ranked his role as one of the best "male performances of the year in any genre, any country", asking, "Has there ever been a Singaporean performance that surpassed Lim's deranged taxi driver?" Neil Humphreys called Lim's "world-class performance" in Perth "almost without parallel", writing, "This is not a portrayal; it's a metamorphosis". Reflecting on his role, Lim said "it was about time. [The film] wasn't commercially successful, but the role was meaningful...I'm still adamant that I should have underplayed certain parts of Harry, but I'm sure [director] Djinn won't back down from his direction."

In 2007, Lim played the lead in The Photograph, speaking Bahasa Indonesia, a role he considers "significant" in his career. The Indonesian feature film won the 2008 Special Jury Prize at the 43rd Karlovy Vary International Film Festival. In the same year, Lim also served as a jury member of the Singapore International Film Festival. In 2010, Lim won the Asian Television Award Best Drama Performance by an Actor in a Supporting Role for his portrayal of Harris Fong in legal drama The Pupil (2010–2011). In 2013, Lim received his second The Straits Times Life! Theatre Awards nomination for Best Actor for Goh Lay Kuan & Kuo Pao Kun (2012–2013), after his first nod for The House of Sleeping Beauties (1994). The Straits Times' Corrie Tan called Lim's performance as Kuo "electrifying...Lim was an incredibly charismatic presence on stage as he breathed life into Kuo's characters. He had a very commanding presence".

In 2014, Lim starred as a fortune teller in HBO (Asia)'s original series, Grace, for which he won the Asian Television Award for Best Supporting Actor for the second time in December 2015. In October, he became the first local star to grace the cover of Esquire Singapore. In the same month, it was revealed that Lim will play founding Prime Minister Lee Kuan Yew in the upcoming film celebrating Singapore's Golden Jubilee, 1965. Lim said, "Lee Kuan Yew is a corner of the story. He frames the timeline, as to when the events take place. It is not overwhelmingly undoable, because it's just a handful of appearances stretched over the time in 1965 and maybe one other scene when he is much older. I overcame my cowardice, and said, 'Let's give it a go and see what happens.'"

In February 2015, Lim reunited with his Growing Up co-star Wee Soon Hui to play husband and wife again in the Channel 5 telemovie Love is Love: Sunset.

In July 2015, Lim portrayed Singapore's first prime minister Lee Kuan Yew in the historical film 1965, including a re-enactment of the iconic press conference when Lee announced that Singapore would be separated from Malaysia. In the same month, Lim read Lee Kuan Yew quotes, paired with music, during a one-night performance with the Singapore Chinese Orchestra.

In August 2015, Lim played the lead role in okto's TV movie, Second Chances, about a group of old folks who break out of an old folks’ home.

In early 2016, Lim played one of the lead roles, Allen, in Ying J. Tan's feature film, Rough Mix''.

From 2017 to 2018, Lim worked on two Singtel advertisement campaigns. He narrated the telecommunications company's "Power On" video series in 2017, and in 2018, starred in their hit Chinese New Year short film, "Mr Lim’s Reunion Dinner". In 2020, Lim returned as the narrator of Singtel's National Day short film.

In 2019, Lim gave an acting masterclass as part of Manulife Singapore's “Stop the Drama” advertisement.

Personal life
Lim is the older brother of fellow actor Lim Kay Siu, who he starred with in multiple plays. His sister, Dr Irene Lim Kay Han, is an actress. He is first cousins with singer-songwriter Dick Lee.

Lim is married to food writer Sylvia Tan Jui Huang  whom playwright Michael Chiang introduced him to. He is also an amateur photographer.

Filmography

Film

Television

Stage

References

External links

1954 births
Living people
Singaporean people of Hokkien descent
Peranakan people in Singapore
Anglo-Chinese School alumni
Alumni of the University of Hull
Alumni of the Webber Douglas Academy of Dramatic Art
Singaporean male stage actors
Singaporean male television actors
Singaporean male film actors
Singaporean journalists
Singaporean male voice actors